= Judenbüchel =

Jewish cemetery in Cologne (Köln), Germany

Coordinates: 50°54′45″N 6°57′31″E

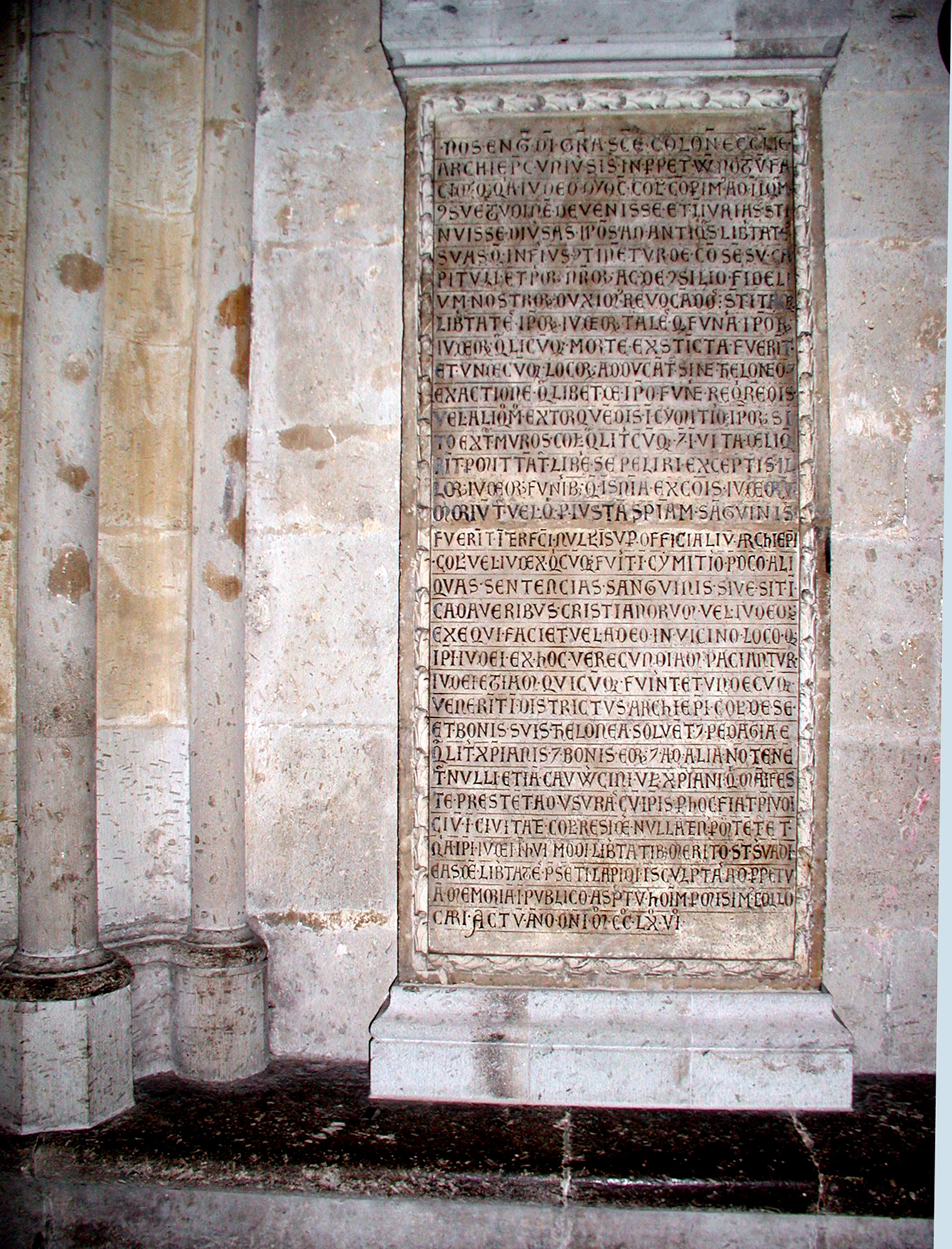
Geusenfriedhof

Judenbüchel is a Jewish cemetery in Cologne, Germany.
